Lian Cheng Jue is a Chinese television series adapted from Louis Cha's novel A Deadly Secret. The series was first broadcast on NMTV in China in 2004.

Cast
 Wu Yue as Di Yun
 Shu Chang as Shui Sheng
 He Meitian as Qi Fang
 Wang Haidi as Ding Dian
 Yu Chenghui as Mei Niansheng
 Liu Xiao Ling Tong as Hua Tiegan
 Yu Dongjiang as Qi Changfa
 Du Zhiguo as Wan Zhenshan
 Qian Yongchen as Wan Gui
 Dong Yangyang as Wang Xiaofeng
 Wang Shihuai as Ling Tuisi
 Gao Beibei as Ling Shuanghua
 Ji Chunhua as Xuedao Laozu
 Zhang Li as Yan Daping
 Ba Tu as Xia Sandao
 Wang Limin as Gen Bao
 Yu Nannan as Gen Bao's wife
 Chen Hao as Wu Kan
 Guo Jun as Shui Dai
 Shu Lun as Lu Tianshu
 Meng He as Liu Chengfeng
 Cao Guoxin as Baoxiang
 Sheng Ning as Lu Kun
 Yu Peng as Shen Cheng
 Zhan Xiaodan as Sun Jun
 A'nan as Feng Tan
 Feng Yun as Ju You
 Wang Jing as Xiang'er
 Kong Qingsan as Shoulaotou
 Zeng Aiyi as Kongxincai
 Wang Zhe as Jailer
 Zhang Peng as Zhao Yan
 Guo Yanhua as Baisui Laoren
 Wang Kai as Liu Daniang
 Zhao Na as Yuhuansao
 Ma Xiaoning as Dibao
 Wang Changling as Squire Wu
 Bai Haipeng as Young master Wu
 Zhang Chunfang as Xiaotongzi
 Liu Wei as Lü Tong
 Zhang Chunsheng as Xiaobao
 Liu Chunsheng as Chen Dazhui
 Zhang Jianguo as Woodcutter Zhang
 Cheng Zhen as Black-robed Taoist
 E Zhicheng as Song Laoping
 Su Ke as Western Shu escort leader
 Yan Ning as monk

See also
 A Deadly Secret
 Deadly Secret

External links
  Lian Cheng Jue on Sina.com
  Lian Cheng Jue at the Chinese Movie Database

2004 Chinese television series debuts
2004 Chinese television series endings
Works based on A Deadly Secret
Chinese wuxia television series
Television series set in Imperial China
Mandarin-language television shows
Wrongful convictions in fiction
Television shows based on works by Jin Yong